Dibek is a village in the İnebolu District of Kastamonu Province in Turkey. Its population is 218 (2021).

References

Villages in İnebolu District